The Lincoln Developmental Center was a state school for people with developmental disabilities in Lincoln, Illinois. It was founded in 1877 as the Illinois Asylum for Feeble-Minded Children, became the Lincoln State School in 1954, and adopted its final name in 1975. It was closed in 2002 by Gov. George Ryan after reports of abuse, neglect and preventable deaths.

According to historian David Bakke, "conditions at the Lincoln State School were horrible; overcrowded and understaffed. It was a community unto itself. The deaths of residents were not investigated, and their bodies were buried on the grounds". According to Edwin Black, author of War Against the Weak, milk from cows diseased with tuberculosis were willingly fed to the patient/residents.

Notable people incarcerated
Henry Darger, who made outsider art
Frank Robert Giroux

References

Educational institutions established in 1877
Educational institutions disestablished in 2002
1877 establishments in Illinois
2002 disestablishments in Illinois
Schools in Logan County, Illinois